The men's 100 metres event at the 1983 Summer Universiade was held at the Commonwealth Stadium in Edmonton, Canada on 5, 6 and 7 July 1983.

Medalists

Results

Heats
Held on 5 July

Quarterfinals
Held on 6 July

Semifinals
Held on 7 July

Wind:Heat 1: +0.6 m/s, Heat 2: +0.5 m/s

Final
Held on 7 July

Wind: -0.8 m/s

References

Athletics at the 1983 Summer Universiade
1983